Frederick Fleet (15 October 1887 – 10 January 1965) was a British sailor, crewman and a survivor of the sinking of the . Fleet, along with fellow lookout Reginald Lee, was on duty when the ship struck the iceberg; Fleet first sighted the iceberg, ringing the bridge to proclaim: "Iceberg, right ahead!" Both Fleet and Lee survived the sinking.

Fleet testified at the subsequent inquiries into the disaster that, if he and Lee had been issued binoculars: "We could have seen it (the iceberg) a bit sooner." When asked how much sooner, he responded, "Well, enough to get out of the way." In later life, Fleet suffered from depression, possibly in part due to the disaster. Fleet committed suicide by hanging in January 1965.

Early life and maritime career 
Fleet was born in Liverpool, England on 15 October 1887. He never knew his father, and his mother abandoned him and ran off with a boyfriend to Springfield, Massachusetts, never to be seen or heard from again. Fleet was raised by a succession of foster families and distant relatives. In 1903 he went to sea as a deck boy, working his way up to able seaman.

Before joining the crew of the RMS Titanic, he had sailed for over four years as a lookout on the RMS Oceanic. As a seaman, Fleet earned five pounds per month plus an extra 5 shillings for lookout duty. He joined the Titanic as a lookout in April 1912, along with five other watchmen.

RMS Titanic
 
Fleet boarded the Titanic in Southampton on 10 April 1912. The ship made two stops, first in Cherbourg, France, and then in Queenstown, Ireland. The lookouts, six in total, made two-hour shifts due to extreme cold in the crow's nest. The trip was uneventful until the night of 14 April 1912. At 22:00 (10 p.m.) that night, Fleet and his fellow lookout Reginald Lee replaced George Symons and Archie Jewell at the nest. They were passed the order given earlier by second officer Charles Lightoller to watch out for small ice. The night was calm and moonless, which made it difficult to spot the icebergs due to the lack of waves breaking against the base of the iceberg and reflection. Despite Fleet and his fellow lookouts repeatedly requesting binoculars, they were never provided. This is sometimes attributed to the last-minute change in the hierarchy of the ship when officer David Blair was removed from the maiden voyage crew (due to the knock-on effect of Henry Tingle Wilde being appointed chief officer) without mentioning where the binoculars had been located. It is also speculated that Blair accidentally took the keys of the cabinet containing the binoculars with him. Despite both inquiries into the disaster, nothing clarified why the lookouts were not provided with binoculars, although evidence suggests that White Star Line steamers' lookouts did not routinely use them. Some experts have said that even using binoculars, neither Fleet nor Lee could have spotted the iceberg any sooner given the conditions of the night.

At 23:39 (11:39 p.m.), Fleet first spotted the iceberg and rang the nest's bell three times to warn the bridge of something ahead. Then, using the nest's telephone, he contacted the bridge. It was answered by sixth officer James Paul Moody, who asked Fleet immediately, "What did you see?" He pronounced the infamous "Iceberg! Right Ahead!" warning. Moody passed Fleet's warning to first officer William McMaster Murdoch, who was in charge of the bridge. After the collision, Fleet and Lee remained on duty for twenty more minutes.

At 00:00 (12 a.m.), Fleet and Lee were relieved by Alfred Frank Evans and George Hogg. Fleet went down to the boat deck and helped prepare Lifeboat No. 6. Second officer Lightoller put quartermaster Robert Hichens in charge of the lifeboat and ordered Fleet aboard as well. As they were lowered away, Hichens and American socialite Margaret Brown realized there were only two sailors, including Fleet, to man the boat, and called for another sailor to be sent. As no able seaman was near, Canadian Colonel Arthur Godfrey Peuchen volunteered to join the boat saying he had experience in sailing. He was ordered by Lightoller to reach the boat by climbing down a rope.

Once away from the sinking ship, the boat tried to reach the lights of a ship in the distance, thought to be the SS Californian. While Hichens remained at the tiller, Fleet and Peuchen managed the oars. Arguments and problems arose on boat 6 as quartermaster Hichens kept insulting and mistreating the rowers, including Margaret Brown and Helen Churchill Candee. Later in the night, there was an argument about whether to return for survivors, with Hichens warning against returning for fear of being swamped by swimmers. The lifeboat finally reached the RMS Carpathia by 6:00 a.m. on Monday, 15 April 1912.

After the disaster, Fleet underwent two inquiries: first, the U.S. Inquiry; secondly, the British Wreck Commissioner's inquiry. In the United States, he was questioned by Senator William Alden Smith, to whom he repeatedly said that had they been equipped with binoculars, the disaster would not have happened. Before the British inquiry, he underwent a long examination but  refused to answer many of the questions. Lord Mersey, Chairman of the Commission, concluded Fleet's interrogation by telling him that he was grateful for his willingness to answer questions despite his wariness when responding to every question. Fleet replied with a sarcastic "Thanks."

World War I, World War II, and later life
Fleet served on the Titanics sister ship RMS Olympic before leaving the White Star Line in August 1912 after noticing that the company treated those involved with the Titanic differently. For the next 24 years he sailed for different shipping companies, including the Union-Castle Line. Fleet served on merchant ships throughout World War I. Later, he was the ship's lookout again on the Olympic during the 1920s and early 1930s. When he left the sea in 1936, he was hired by Harland & Wolff to work at the company's shipyards in Southampton. While working there, he lived with his wife's brother. He served again during World War II.

Later, closer to retirement, he became a newspaper salesman and experienced financial difficulties.

Death
Shortly after Christmas, on 28 December 1964, Fleet's wife died, and her brother evicted him from the house. Consequently, Fleet fell into a downward spiral of depression. He returned to his brother-in-law's home and hanged himself in the house's garden on 10 January 1965. Fleet was buried in a pauper's grave at Hollybrook Cemetery, in Southampton. This grave remained unmarked until 1993, when a headstone bearing an engraving of the Titanic was erected through donations raised by the Titanic Historical Society.

References

External links

 Frederick Fleet Encyclopedia Titanica biography
 Frederick Fleet Titanic Pages biography
 

1887 births
1965 deaths
1965 suicides
19th-century English people
20th-century English people
British Merchant Navy personnel of World War II
British Merchant Service personnel of World War I
Burials in Hampshire
Sailors from Liverpool
RMS Titanic survivors
Suicides by hanging in England
Burials at Hollybrook Cemetery